The 1914 Tube Stock was built for an extension of the BS&WR (Bakerloo tube).  Twelve motor cars were built, ten by Brush in Loughborough, England and two by the Leeds Forge Company.  Trailer cars were transferred from the Piccadilly line where they had been surplus.

The twelve motor cars were numbered 38 - 39 (Leeds Forge) and 40 - 49 (Brush). These motor cars were the first built new with doors located in the centre of the body.  These were hand operated with an electric lock to keep them closed.

They were phased out circa 1935.

External links
London Transport Museum Photographic Archive

1914
Train-related introductions in 1914